The Danger Mark is a lost 1918 American silent drama film directed by Hugh Ford and starring Elsie Ferguson.  It was produced by Famous Players-Lasky, and distributed by Paramount Pictures. It is based on a play by Robert W. Chambers. Prior to the film's release, the play was published in "serial form and later issued as a book."

Plot
As described in a film magazine, Geraldine Seagrave (Ferguson), addicted to the drinking habit, becomes intoxicated the night of her debut and later, because of this condition, refuses the love of Duane Mallett (Hamilton). Jack Dysart (Kent), eager to recuperate his fallen fortunes, endeavors to win Geraldine but she, after learning that Duane's sister Sylvia (McCoy) loves Jack, cleverly arranges it so that Sylvia and Jack become engaged and then married. Duane, after finally persuades Geraldine to become engaged to him, comes to believe that she has been false and leaves a note stating that he will never return. The craving for alcohol almost overwhelms Geraldine but she fights it off, and when Duane learns the true state of affairs he returns and Duane and Geraldine are reunited.

Cast
Elsie Ferguson as Geraldine Seagrave
Mahlon Hamilton as Duane Mallett
Crauford Kent as Jack Dysart
Gertrude McCoy as Sylvia Mallett
Edmund Burns as Scott Seagrave (as Edward Burns)
Maude Turner Gordon as Kathleen Severn
William T. Carleton as Colonel Mallett

References

External links

AllMovie.com
Chambers, Robert W. (1909), The Danger Mark, New York: D. Appleton and Co., on the Internet Archive
Lobby card(archived)

1918 films
American silent feature films
American films based on plays
Films based on works by Robert W. Chambers
Films directed by Hugh Ford
1918 drama films
American black-and-white films
Lost American films
Silent American drama films
1918 lost films
Lost drama films
1910s American films